ARC Visvanathan College is an arts and science college located in Mayiladuthurai in Tamil Nadu, India. Founded in 2000, it is a self-financed co-educational institution affiliated to the Bharathidasan University.

References 
 

Colleges affiliated to Bharathidasan University
Education in Mayiladuthurai district
Educational institutions established in 2000
2000 establishments in Tamil Nadu